The Head is an American science-fiction adult animated television series created by Eric Fogel for MTV. It originated as a science-fiction mini-series that aired under the MTV's Oddities label between 1994 and 1996, and was followed by The Maxx. The series was released on DVD on December 15, 2009.

Plot
Created by Celebrity Deathmatch creator Eric Fogel, The Head is the story of Jim, a trade-school student in New York City who awakens one morning to find that his cranium has enlarged to mammoth proportions. A week later, out bursts Roy, a little purple alien with an odd sense of humor who has taken up residence in Jim's head. Roy needed a place to stay to adapt to the Earth's environment while on a mission to save the world from a power-hungry alien named Gork.

Roy explains that there are two races of symbiotic aliens: his own, which is mutualistic; and Gork's, which is parasitic. Aiding Jim and Roy are Jim's girlfriend, Madelyn; his personal physician, Dr. Richard Axel; and a group of "human anomalies." The group consists of Ray, a landscaper who has a lawnmower blade lodged in his skull; Mona, a beautiful young woman with a short tail; Ivan, a Russian who has a mouth in his chest; Raquel, who has an enormous nose and buckteeth which give her a slightly ratlike appearance; Earl, who has a fishbowl in his mouth; Chin, a long-limbed former freak show performer from China; and the annoyingly normal head of the group, Shane Blackman.

A major notable aspect was that it was the first ever voice acting role for John DiMaggio.

Characters
 Jim – A trade-school student who seemed to be an average joe before Roy entered his head. He had a crush on Madelyn, whom he described as the most beautiful girl in his arc-welding class, but it took a while to gather the nerve to even ask her name. Since Roy began associating with him, Jim's confidence and self-image have grown and he has become a courageous, quick-thinking hero.
 Roy – A purple alien from outer space. Roy is his nickname, but his true name is only pronounceable in an alien language that sounds suspiciously like reverse English – played backwards, "I'm from outer space". Because of an attack by a race of parasitic aliens, his species is few in number. Roy wants to save Earth from an even worse fate. To do so, he must reassemble his Anti-Invasion Machine, which was accidentally broken into five pieces and scattered around the world during his entry into Earth's atmosphere. Roy has telepathic powers, which he can use to communicate with Jim from afar and call up clairvoyant visions.
 Dr. Richard Axel – Jim's physician, a head specialist. Before Jim found out about Roy, Dr. Axel took an x-ray of his head and found only a black mass. He urged Jim to continue his appointments, which Jim refused to do. Soon afterwards, Dr. Axel was kidnapped by Dr. Elliot and his imbecilic agent cohorts. Jim rescued him, and he agreed to help Jim and Roy reassemble the Anti-Invasion Machine. 
 Madelyn – Jim's girlfriend. At first, she is merely his crush. She is a faithful woman who admits her love to Jim rather early in the relationship. She comes to his apartment for dinner the night Jim found out about Roy, and there she was attacked by Gork. Gork entered her head, causing it to grow to the size of Jim's. Gork was eventually forced out of Madelyn's head by Jim. Jim and Gork brawled for a few minutes before Dr. Elliot arrived and seized Gork. Afterward, Madelyn's head returned to normal size, and she decided to help Jim and Roy.
 Gork – A member of the evil alien race that destroyed Roy's planet and now wants to eat the brains of every human on Earth. He speaks alternately in three different voices. One voice sounds much like backwards English and is apparently his native language – one is very sinister and is obviously his own, speaking American English – and the third sounds like a human with a posh West-London (or a "Proper") British English accent. The third voice was commonly used when persuading Dr. Elliot (who would have been less likely to be assuaged by a sinister alien voice). Gork's special powers include the ability to control the mind he has inhabited, telekinesis, and the ability to emit painful energy from his head.
 Dr. Lucas Elliot – A member of an unnamed government agency. He is very paranoid and firmly believes in the existence of aliens, Sasquatch, and other far-fetched urban legends. Because of this, he was a major figure of ridicule at the institute where he was taught. It seems Gork is the reason for this. As a child, Dr. Elliot saw Gork inhabit and kill a farmer. The only reason Gork let Elliot live is because he was too young and thus his mind was not advanced enough to be "inhabited." Dr. Elliot always travels with two doltish government agents who, it turns out, have a crush on each other.
 Shane Blackman – Runs a support group that Jim is part of. Blackman is an acquaintance of Madelyn's. Through Blackman's support group, Jim ends up meeting a group of abnormal friends who aid him throughout his adventures.

Broadcast
After the initial 13 fifteen-minute installments had aired, MTV's Oddities began airing another serial, entitled The Maxx. When The Maxx had finished airing, The Head returned with a fifteen-minute recap of season 1 (The Pasquale Mendoza Show) and a new season of thirty-minute episodes, but the focus often shifted from Jim and Roy to the other "human anomalies" they had befriended. The second season lacked the serialized story structure and each episode began with a secondary opening sequence (following the Oddities credits) which introduced the characters/premise. Shortly after the second season finished airing, The Head (along with "MTV's Oddities") vanished from the airwaves.

Reruns of the series were seen briefly on MTV2 in August 2009.

Episodes

Series overview

Season 1 (1994–95)

Season 2 (1996)

Home release
The first 13 episodes were released on VHS under the title The Head Saves the Earth. Snippets from the original airings were left off the video version (a similar edit was made to The Maxx video) to keep the running time under two hours. The second season was never released on VHS.

The "complete series" was released on DVD on December 15, 2009, via Amazon.com through their CreateSpace manufacture-on-demand program. This release omits the MTV's Oddities opening credits sequence, "Inside The Head," a 15-minute making-of which originally aired after "The Pasquale Mendoza Show"/"The Rise and Fall of Jim" during the hour-long second-season premiere (it was paired with the shorter "Pasquale Mendoza" segment for  half-hour reruns), as well as the 15-minute preview of The Maxx which followed the episode "The Invasion."

Other media

Cancelled video game
A video game version of the show was planned and was going to released both Super Nintendo Entertainment System and Sega Genesis in February 1995, but was cancelled very early into development. However, the source code for the Genesis version was discovered in May 2014.

Graphic novel
In 1996, Pocket Books released a 96-page graphic novel entitled The Head: A Legend Is Born, which was based on an unfilmed script. The cover shows a picture of Jim, and a rectangular panel folds out to reveal a large pop-up of Roy inside of his head.

The story takes place after the events in season 2.  Roy and Jim have parted ways but reunite to save Mark, Roy's younger brother, who has sent out a distress call from a ship in outer space.  Meanwhile, Madelyn is abducted by Gork, and Dr. Elliot makes his triumphant return to wreak havoc upon the Earth with the help of his "children". Jim and Madeline's child is born—and they name it "Mark".

References

External links 
 
 The Head Official site - MTV

1990s American adult animated television series
1990s American comic science fiction television series
1994 American television series debuts
1996 American television series endings
American adult animated fantasy television series
American animated science fantasy television series
American adult animated comedy television series
American adult animated science fiction television series
American comic science fiction television series
English-language television shows
MTV cartoons
Fictional humanoids
Animated television series about extraterrestrial life
Television series created by Eric Fogel
Television shows set in New York (state)